The 2012 European Mixed Curling Championship was held from September 30 to October 6 at the Milli Piyango Curling Arena in Erzurum, Turkey. In the final, Scotland, skipped by Ewan MacDonald, defeated Sweden, skipped by Rickard Hallström, with a score of 8–4.

Teams
The teams are listed as follows:

Red Group

Blue Group

Green Group

Round-robin standings
Final round-robin standings

Round-robin results
All draw times listed in Eastern European Summer Time (UTC+3).

Red Group

Monday, October 1
Draw 3 
12:30

Draw 5 
19:30

Tuesday, October 2
Draw 7 
12:30

Draw 9 
19:30

Wednesday, October 3
Draw 10 
9:00

Draw 11 
12:30

Draw 12
16:00

Draw 13 
19:30

Thursday, October 4
Draw 14 
8:30

Draw 16 
15:30

Blue Group

Sunday, September 30
Draw 1 
19:30

Monday, October 1
Draw 2 
9:00

Draw 3 
12:30

Draw 4 
16:00

Draw 5 
19:30

Tuesday, October 2
Draw 6 
9:00

Draw 8 
16:00

Wednesday, October 3
Draw 11 
12:30

Draw 13 
19:30

Thursday, October 4
Draw 14 
8:30

Draw 15 
12:00

Draw 16
15:30

Draw 17 
19:00

Green Group

Monday, October 1
Draw 2 
9:00

Draw 4 
16:00

Tuesday, October 2
Draw 6 
9:00

Draw 7 
12:30

Draw 8 
16:00

Draw 9 
19:30

Wednesday, October 3
Draw 10 
9:00

Draw 12
16:00

Thursday, October 4
Draw 15 
12:00

Draw 17
19:00

Playoffs

Quarterfinals
Friday, October 5, 9:00

Semifinals
Friday, October 5, 21:00

Bronze medal game
Saturday, October 6, 17:00

Gold medal game
Saturday, October 6, 17:00

References

External links

European Curling Federation Home Page

European Mixed Curling Championship
2012 in curling
2012 in Turkish sport
International curling competitions hosted by Turkey
2012